Russell Spiers (born 28 April 1991) is a professional rugby league footballer who last played for the Midlands Hurricanes in Betfred League 1. He previously played in Betfred League 1 for Doncaster

Playing career
In October 2016 he re-signed for Doncaster having spent the previous season at York City Knights.

References

External links
Doncaster profile
Profile at wakefieldwildcats.co.uk

1991 births
Living people
Dewsbury Rams players
Doncaster R.L.F.C. players
English rugby league players
Place of birth missing (living people)
Rugby league locks
Rugby league props
Wakefield Trinity players
York City Knights players